The Algona Brownies were an independent interracial baseball team that played in the 1902 and 1903 seasons. They were based in Algona, Iowa, and was primarily made up of former members of the Chicago Unions, Columbia Giants, and  Chicago Union Giants teams.

During their second and final season, the team makeup changed from having both black and white players to a team of only black players. That year, their final year, they won the Western championship, defeating the Chicago Union Giants in a challenge playoff.

Players
Some of the regular players were:

References

External links
Algona Brownies at Seamheads.com

Negro league baseball teams
Defunct baseball teams in Iowa
Algona, Iowa
1902 establishments in Iowa
Baseball teams established in 1902
Baseball teams disestablished in 1906